Peter Veselovský (born 11 November 1964 in Liptovský Mikuláš) is a Slovak former professional ice hockey player.

Veselovský played for HC Košice in the Czechoslovak Extraliga and the Slovak Extraliga. He also played for MHk 32 Liptovský Mikuláš, Drakkars de Caen, Dunaújvárosi Acélbikák, HK 36 Skalica and HK Spišská Nová Ves.

He also played on the Olympic Bronze Medal winning ice hockey team for Czechoslovakia in 1992.

Career statistics

Regular season and playoffs

International

References

External links

1964 births
Living people
Czechoslovak ice hockey forwards
Drakkars de Caen players
HK Dukla Michalovce players
Dunaújvárosi Acélbikák players
HC Košice players
HC Karlovy Vary players
Ice hockey players at the 1992 Winter Olympics
MHk 32 Liptovský Mikuláš players
Medalists at the 1992 Winter Olympics
Olympic bronze medalists for Czechoslovakia
Olympic ice hockey players of Czechoslovakia
Olympic medalists in ice hockey
Sportspeople from Liptovský Mikuláš
HK 36 Skalica players
Slovak ice hockey forwards
HK Spišská Nová Ves players
Slovak expatriate ice hockey players in the Czech Republic
Slovak expatriate sportspeople in Hungary
Slovak expatriate sportspeople in France
Expatriate ice hockey players in France
Expatriate ice hockey players in Hungary